Denmark competed at the Winter Olympic Games for the first time at the 1948 Winter Olympics in St. Moritz, Switzerland.

Figure skating

Men

Speed skating

Men

References

 Olympic Winter Games 1948, full results by sports-reference.com

Nations at the 1948 Winter Olympics
1948
Olympics